Rik Tommelein (born 1 November 1962) is a Belgian hurdler. He competed in the men's 400 metres hurdles at the 1984 Summer Olympics.

References

1962 births
Living people
Athletes (track and field) at the 1984 Summer Olympics
Belgian male hurdlers
Olympic athletes of Belgium
World Athletics Championships athletes for Belgium
Place of birth missing (living people)